Clio Area School District is a public school district in Genesee County in the U.S. state of Michigan and in the Genesee Intermediate School District. The district includes all of the city of Clio; the majorities of Vienna Township, and Thetford Township; and parts of Mount Morris Township, and Montrose Township, Michigan.

Clio Schools operates a four-tier configuration for district schools. Grades K–3 are assigned to elementary level, 4 and 5 are assigned to the Intermediate level, 6–8 are assigned to the middle school level, and 9–12 to the high school level.

Attendants of the Clio Area High School require 28.5 credits to graduate; 25.5 of the credits must be earned through Clio High School. The rest are to be earned through correspondence schools, virtual high school, and adult education courses, etc. If a student does not have at least this many credits, there are credit make-up programs available.

Athletics

Clio was a charter member of the Genesee County B League, formed in 1950. In 1960, Clio, along with seven other schools from around Genesee County left the GCBL to form the Big Eight Conference. The conference would later be renamed the Big Nine Conference in 1968 after the addition of an additional member school.

Clio remained a member of the Big Nine Conference through the end of the 2004-05 school year, when the district applied for and was granted membership into the Flint Metro League for competitive reasons. While in the Big Nine, Clio teams had great success in baseball, wrestling, girls' golf, and girls' basketball.

Though Clio has no recognized Michigan High School Athletic Association team state championships, the school finished as state runner-up for girls' cross-country (1980), and girls' golf (2000–2006). The school has had several individual state champions in boys' wrestling and girls' cross-country.

Recently the boys' cross-country team took second place at the Michigan State Spartan Invitational (2012).

The press box located at the Clio High School's Pride Stadium was renamed in 1991 in honor of long time Clio resident and former Board of Education member Robert Sheppard. Sheppard, who was the public address announcer for the Mustangs for many years, was killed in a collision in Chesaning, MI in 1990.

References

External links
 http://www.clioschools.org

School districts in Michigan
Education in Genesee County, Michigan